Weston railway station may refer to:

Currently open stations:
 Weston GO Station, a GO Transit station in Toronto, Ontario, Canada
 Weston-super-Mare railway station, in Somerset, England
 Weston Milton railway station, in Somerset, England

Disused stations:
 Weston railway station (Lincolnshire), England
 Weston railway station (Bath), England
 Weston station (MBTA), Weston, Massachusetts, United States